Luise Malzahn (born 9 January 1990) is a German retired judoka. She competed at the 2016 Summer Olympics in Rio de Janeiro, in the women's 78 kg. She finished in 5th place after losing to Anamari Velenšek of Slovenia in the bronze medal match.

References

External links
 
 
 
 

1990 births
Living people
German female judoka
Olympic judoka of Germany
Judoka at the 2016 Summer Olympics
Sportspeople from Halle (Saale)
Judoka at the 2015 European Games
Judoka at the 2019 European Games
European Games medalists in judo
European Games silver medalists for Germany
21st-century German women